Keith Marshall may refer to:

Keith Marshall (baseball) (born 1951), Major League Baseball outfielder
Keith Marshall (American football) (born 1994), American football running back for the Georgia Bulldogs
Keith Marshall (Australian footballer) (1907–1993), Australian rules footballer who played with Fitzroy
 Keith Marshall, member of the band Hello